The 1902 Oklahoma A&M Aggies football team represented Oklahoma A&M College in the 1902 college football season. This was the second year of football at A&M and the team did not have a head coach. The Aggies played their home games in Stillwater, Oklahoma Territory. The Aggies only played one game in the 1902 season, a 40-0 victory over the Central State Normal School club. This was A&M's first undefeated season.

NOTE: The 2016 Oklahoma State Cowboys Football Guide states that the college did not field an official team in 1902.

Schedule

References

Oklahoma AandM
Oklahoma State Cowboys football seasons
Oklahoma Aggies